8 Days or Eight Days may refer to:

 8 Days (magazine), a Singaporean weekly
 8 Days, a CD given away with the album Variations on a Dream by The Pineapple Thief
 Eight Days, an unreleased video game for the PlayStation 3
 Eight Days, Assassination Attempts against King Jeongjo, a 2007 South Korean TV series
 "Eight Days", a song by Pitchshifter from PSI
 Eight Days: A Story of Haiti, a picture book by Edwidge Danticat
 "8 Days," A 2015 suspense movie

See also
 Eight Days a Week (disambiguation)